Diode memory uses diodes and resistors to implement random-access memory for information storage. The devices have been dubbed “one diode-one resistor” (1D-1R).

Silicon dioxide
One implementation uses a silicon dioxide chip. As in most memory chips, the circuits require only two terminals instead of three.  The approach resists heat and radiation.

The design uses a crossbar (a rectangular grid) architecture. When electricity passes through a layer of silicon oxide, it strips away oxygen molecules and creates a channel of pure metallic-phase silicon less than five nanometers wide.

The diodes eliminate the crosstalk inherent in crossbar structures by keeping the electronic state on a cell from leaking into adjacent cells. They have a high on/off ratio of about 10,000 to 1, over the equivalent of 10 years of use, with low energy consumption.

References

Types of RAM
Silicon dioxide
Diodes